A business proposal is a written offer from a seller to a prospective sponsor.
Business proposals are often a key step in the complex sales process—i.e., whenever a buyer considers more than price in a purchase. When one person signifies to another their willingness to do or to abstain from doing anything with a view to obtaining the assent of the other to such act or abstinence, they are said to make a proposal.

A proposal puts the buyer's requirements in a context that favors the seller's products and services, and educates the buyer about the seller's capability to satisfy their needs.

Types of proposals
There are three distinct categories of business proposals:
 Formally solicited 
 Informally solicited
 Unsolicited

Solicited proposals are written in response to published requirements, contained in a request for proposal (RFP), request for quotation (RFQ), invitation for bid (IFB), or a request for information (RFI).

Request for proposal (RFP)

RFPs provide detailed specifications of what the customer wants to buy and sometimes include directions for preparing the proposal, as well as evaluation criteria the customer will use to evaluate offers. Customers issue RFPs when their needs cannot be met with generally available products or services. RFIs are issued to qualify the vendors who are interested in providing service/products for specific requirements. Based on the response to RFI, detailed RFP is issued to qualified vendors who the organization believes can provide desired services. Proposals in response to RFPs are seldom less than 10 pages and sometimes reach thousands of pages, without cost data.
 
Request for quotation (RFQ)

Customers issue RFQs when they want to buy large amounts of a commodity and price is not the only issue—for example, when availability or delivering or service are considerations. RFQs can be very detailed, so proposals written to RFQs can be lengthy but are generally much shorter than an RFP-proposal. RFQ proposals consist primarily of cost data, with brief narratives addressing customer issues, such as quality control.
 
Invitation for bid (IFB)

Customers issue IFBs when they are buying some service, such as construction. The requirements are detailed, but the primary consideration is price. For example, a customer provides architectural blueprints for contractors to bid on. These proposals can be lengthy but most of the length comes from cost-estimating data and detailed schedules.

Request for information (RFI)

Sometimes before a customer issues an RFP or RFQ or IFB, the customer will issue a Request for Information (RFI). The purpose of the RFI is to gain "marketing intelligence" about what products, services, and vendors are available. RFIs are used to shape final RFPs, RFQs, and IFBs, so potential vendors take great care in responding to these requests, hoping to shape the eventual formal solicitation toward their products or services.

Informally solicited proposal (Sole-source contract)
These types of proposals are made when a private firm, government agency, or association negotiates to supply a service or product to a single company and when a company has excellent credibility and a track record of achievements. The standard format for this type of proposal consists of information about a specific product, including the price and delivery schedules. Some advantages to this include not having to have resources to win a contract and the firm or client knows what time the work will be coming.

Internal proposals

Internal proposals are ideas or projects that are presented to whoever holds the position of top management in a company. These types of proposals can be written by a particular individual, group, department, or division of a particular company. One example of this is when the manager of a product line writes a proposal suggesting that the company should robotize the production process. Some advantages to this includes easier communication, knowing the client's needs and making fast decisions. Some advantages to this may include competition from other companies and the loss of management champions.

Unsolicited proposal
Unsolicited proposals are marketing brochures. They are always generic, with no direct connection between customer needs or specified requirements. Vendors use them to introduce a product or service to a prospective customer. They are often used as "leave-behinds" at the end of initial meetings with or customers or "give-aways" at trade shows or other public meetings. They are not designed to close a sale, just introduce the possibility of a sale.

Components

Formally solicited proposals
 Requirements Matrix, which matches customer requirements with the paragraph and page numbers of where those requirements are addressed in the proposal
 Executive Summary, which outlines the primary benefits of the vendor's solutions to the customer's requirements
 Technical Volume, which demonstrates how each requirement will be met
 Management Volume, which describes how the program will be managed
 Cost Volume, which provides all costing data, as well as implementation plans and schedules

Informally solicited business proposal 
 A description of the seller's capabilities or products
 A discussion of key issues
 A description of the buyer's specifications and how they will be met
 The cost of the offering
 A schedule for delivery of the products or services
 Proof of prior experience i.e. Testimonials from previous customers, Descriptions of previous projects

Managing business proposals

Managing proposals presents an enormous challenge for sales and marketing teams. Many established management methods are ill-suited to deal with the broader issues associated with the production and delivery of proposals. In these cases, organizations often rely on outsourcing by identifying a proposal manager to support their proposal development needs.

The process of proposal management
Proposal management is an inherently collaborative process. It often consists of the following basic roles and responsibilities:
 Creator – responsible for creating and editing content.
 Editor – responsible for tuning the content message and the style of delivery, including translation and localization.
 Publisher – responsible for releasing the content for use.
 Administrator – responsible for managing access permissions to documents and files, usually accomplished by assigning access rights to user groups or roles.
 Consumer or viewer – the person who reads or otherwise takes in content after it is published or shared.

Increasingly, the term proposal management is being used to suggest that engagement with the proposal process is important to more than just the sales team, and should also affect those working in marketing, legal, and sales.

Some writers refer to key stages in the proposal management process using colour codes to denote milestone reviews, for example a black hat review. The Association of Proposal Management Professionals (APMP) refers to a black hat review as an independent review of the strategies and proposals likely to be put forward by competitors. According to Carl Dickson of the Capture Planning website, a black hat review should tell an organisation which competitors are strong in their own areas of weakness and which are weaker where they are strong, and is therefore also potentially used to determine whether partnering with one rival organisation might be a viable proposal. Other colours are used in relation to teams: a pre-writing strategy review is sometimes called a "Pink Team", a formal draft review may be called a "Red Team", and the term "Gold Team" indicates a final pre-submission review. Dickson notes that these terms are not consistently defined.

Inherent to the process of managing proposal is the decision of whether to submit a bid, which is underpinned by the capture plan.

There is also a trend towards using proposal management software, which allows users to quickly and easily create proposals, collaborate with team members, and track and analyze customer engagement.

See also 
 Bidding
 Call for bids
 Construction bidding
 E-procurement
 Procurement
 Proposal theme statement
 Presales
 Offer and acceptance

References

Cited references

General references
 
 Binda Zane, Edoardo; (2016), Writing Proposals: A Handbook Of What Makes Your Project Right For Funding 
 
 
 Ricci, Laura; (2014), The Magic of Winning Proposals (publisher Help Everybody Everyday) .
 Riley, Patrick G.; (2002), The One Page Proposal: How to Get Your Business Pitch onto One Persuasive Page (New York: HarperCollins) .

 01
.
Management theory
Sales